Eskɨnuopitijk or Esgenoôpetitj  ( Burnt Church Band or Burnt Church First Nation ) is a Mi'kmaq First Nation band government in New Brunswick, Canada, centred south of the community of Lagacéville (approximately 4.5 km) and southwest of the village of Neguac (approximately 7 km) on Miramichi Bay. It covers two Indian reserves in Northumberland County (Esgenoôpetitj 14, previously Burnt Church 14, and Tabusintac 9) and two reserves in Gloucester County (Pokemouche 13) (Pabineau). The population was 1,715 as of 2011.  The Mi'kmaq call Burnt Church Esgenoôpetitj, which means "a lookout".

History

The lands at Burnt Church have long been occupied by First Nations peoples, long before European colonizers first plundered the Atlantic Coast of Canada. As William Francis Ganong notes, "a map by Sieur I'Hermitte, ... shows there was a village here in 1727."

Ganong also comments on the origin of the name, noting that in 1758, during the Gulf of St. Lawrence Campaign (1758), British General James Wolfe directed Colonel James Murray to destroy the French settlements at Miramichi. Thus, Murray destroyed an Acadian community which had been established at Burnt Church, including burning the first stone church built in New Brunswick (hence the name). (The British also deported the Acadians across the river at Bay du Vin, New Brunswick.)

Burnt Church was a favourite resort of the Mi'kmaq and was, therefore, included in one of the very earliest Indian reserves set aside by New Brunswick. At the time of Ganong's writing it was "still a favorite Micmac settlement, and much the largest in all New Brunswick".

Following the Seven Years' War, several Acadian families returned to lands adjoining the reserve.  They were followed by a wave of new Scottish settlers.  Thus, the Burnt Church name is now used in reference to both the local First Nation, and to the adjoining non-native community.

In recent years, Burnt Church First Nation members have fought strenuously for their traditional lobster fishing rights, culminating in the Burnt Church Crisis with the provincial and federal governments as well as local non-native fishermen.

Notable people

See also
List of communities in New Brunswick
First Nations in New Brunswick

References

Communities in Northumberland County, New Brunswick
Mi'kmaq governments
Mi'kmaq in Canada